Kiley Dean (born April 12, 1982) is an American contemporary R&B singer. Dean was born and raised in a small town in Arkansas. When she was about 7 years old, her family decided to move to Orlando. She grew up singing in school and church, which led her to singing back-up for Britney Spears' tours, "…Baby One More Time" and "Oops!... I Did It Again" as well as Madonna's tours, "Sticky & Sweet", "MDNA" and "Rebel Heart."

Career
In 2002, she was signed to Timbaland's short-lived Beat Club Records, releasing two singles before her Timbaland-produced debut, Simple Girl, was shelved. In 2005, she set work on her second album under the name 'Blue Eyes' and released a single "Lookin' For Love" to radio. Her second studio album Changes was set to be released in 2006, preceded by the single "Who I Am," which was sent out to radio.

The following year, she signed with Mathew Knowles' Music World Entertainment label in 2007. She was set to release her album "Changes" on the label, but left soon after six months.

In 2008, she joined pop singer Madonna on her Sticky & Sweet Tour as a backup vocalist, replacing Madonna's long-time backing singer Donna De Lory, who was pregnant at the time and unable to tour.

In 2010, she released her album "Changes" digitally on the ReverbNation store for a limited time. Later that year, she recorded a couple of remixes which was made available on YouTube and her Soundcloud accounts.

She joined the New Kids On The Block and Matthew Morrison tours in 2011, singing backup for them.

As of 2012, she's currently singing backup for Madonna. She performed on her MDNA Tour and Rebel Heart Tour runs.

In 2015, she launched a Kickstarter campaign to fund her Scream EP which successfully met its goal in February. In July, she premiered the EP's first single and music video "Lockdown" to her backers, with the digital release (and YouTube/VEVO) in August. On September 21, the EP was made available to her backers, with a digital release set in the next following weeks.

Personal life
She married musician Mason McSpadden on October 26, 2015.

In a blog post in March 2018, she announced she & her husband welcomed their first child Sullivan Sue McSpadden in May 2017.

Discography

Albums
 2003: Simple Girl (Unreleased)
 
 
 
 
 
 
 
 
 
 
 
 
 
 
 
 
 
 
 2006: Changes (Unreleased)
 2006: Who I Am [EP] (Digital)
 
 
 
 
 
 2010: Changes (Digital)
 
 
 
 
 
 
 
 
 
 
 2010: Remixes. (Digital)
 
 
 
 
 
 
 
 
 
 
 2015: Scream (Digital)

Singles
 "Make Me a Song" (2003)
 "Who Will I Run To?" (2003)
 "Lookin' For Love" (2005) (as Blue Eyes)
 "Who I Am" (2006)
 "Lockdown" (2015)
 "Scream" (2015)
 "Backseat" (2015)

Unreleased/Leaked
 Simple Girl era
 
 
 
 
 Changes era
 
 
 
 
 
 
 
 
 
 
 
 
 
 
 
 TBA

Guest appearances
 DJ Enuff & Timbaland Present Bubba Sparxxx & The Muddkatz — New South: The Album B4 the Album (2003)
 
 
 Bubba Sparxxx — Deliverance (2004)
 
 Timbaland — The World Is Ours (2004)
 
 Shelby Norman
 
 
 Unity: The Official Athens 2004 Olympic Games Album  (2004)
 
 Luis Oliart — Luis Oliart EP (2007)
 
 Randy Jackson — Randy Jackson's Music Club: Volume One (2008)
 
 Flo Rida — Mail On Sunday (2008)
 
 Luis Oliart & John Carta (2010)
 
 Fabian Buch — Hello Hello (2010)

Charts

References

External links
 Official Site
 YouTube Channel

1982 births
Living people
American contemporary R&B singers
People from Alma, Arkansas
21st-century American singers
21st-century American women singers